Phyllis is a genus of plants in the Rubiaceae. There are two known species, both native to islands in the eastern North Atlantic Ocean.

Description
Glabrous evergreen sub-shrubs. Stems rounded, smooth. Leaves in whorls of 3, with small linear stipules in between, or with petiole indistinct. Inflorescence of axillary and terminal compound panicle-like dichasia, each many-flowered and bracteates. Calyx absent. Corolla (4-)5 lobed, the lobes spreading to  strongly recurved, white to green. Fruit  dry, of 2 mericarps, glabrous except on inner faces.

Species
Phyllis nobla L. - Madeira, Canary Islands
Phyllis viscosa Webb ex Christ - Canary Islands

References

External links

 Flora Vascular de las Canarias, Phyllis nobla
 Madeira Flora
 Czech Botany, Phyllis nobla

Rubiaceae genera
Anthospermeae